Shaheed Path is an outer bypass road constructed to divert the traffic coming from Kanpur Road or Faizabad Road vice versa can go to their destination without facing the heavy traffic of the colonial streets and roads of Lucknow. Shaheed Path or Amar Shaheed Path is also known as APJ Abdul Kalam Road.

History 
It was a dream project of former Prime Minister Atal Behari Vajpayee, who represented the Lucknow constituency in the Lok Sabha. It was started in 2001 and was scheduled for  completion in 2004, but due to regime change and shortage of funds it got delayed and was finally completed only in 2012.

Stretch 
Shaheed Path is 23 km long and is a part of the east-west corridor, the Shaheed Path will connect Lucknow-Kanpur Road (NH-25) with Lucknow-Faizabad (NH-28) via Lucknow-Sultanpur Road (NH-56) and Lucknow-Raebareli Road (NH30). The total stretch of the flyover is 22.5 kilometres. The four-lane flyover has a uniform width and each side of the divider is 8.75 meters wide. It starts from Transport Nagar metro station at Kanpur Road and meets at Chinhat at Faizabad Road.

Use 
It is a 4 lane express highway for the traffic from Kanpur Road or Faizabad Road vice versa to go to other highways coming along the bypass. The flyover has service lanes and under passes at NH-56 and NH-24 that links it to Lucknow-Sultanpur and Lucknow-Rae Bareli national highways respectively.
Besides this, the flyover has been connected to the various important localities like Gomtinagar and Gomtinagar extension to allow residents to use the facility accordingly.

References 

Roads in Lucknow
2012 establishments in Uttar Pradesh